Adelococcus is a genus of fungi in the family Adelococcaceae.

References

Eurotiomycetes genera
Verrucariales
Taxa named by Ferdinand Theissen
Taxa named by Hans Sydow
Taxa described in 1918